FWD Group is a multinational insurance company based in Hong Kong. Founded in 2013 as the insurance arm of Pacific Century Group, FWD Group sells life and medical insurance, general insurance and employee benefits in Asia. The company had USD$50.9 billion in assets under management in 2020 and in 2021 was managing US$63 billion in assets. On February 28, 2022, FWD filed for a HK IPO. FWD currently operates in Hong Kong, Japan, Macau, Singapore, Thailand, Philippines, Indonesia, Vietnam, Malaysia and Cambodia.

History

2013-18 

Richard Li of Pacific Century Group formed FWD Group in 2013 after purchasing ING Group’s insurance and pension units in Hong Kong, Macau and Thailand for US$2.1 billion. Swiss Re bought a 12.3% stake in FWD Group in 2013 for $425 million. Huynh Thanh Phong joined as CEO in 2013. The company then expanded into the Philippines in 2014 and Indonesia in 2015. Expanding into three more countries in 2016, that year FWD Group acquired Shenton Insurance in Singapore,  also purchasing a unit from Great Eastern Holdings Ltd. in Vietnam for $35 million. In late 2016, FWD agreed to buy AIG's Fuji Life Insurance Co. in Japan. By April 2017, FWD had $24.4 billion in assets under management and sponsored the Clockenflap music festival. In 2018 FWD agreed to purchase an Indonesian life insurance venture, PT Commonwealth Life, from the Commonwealth Bank of Australia for $300 million. When the acquisition completed in 2020, PT Commonwealth Life was rebranded PT FWD Life Indonesia. FWD Group also purchased HSBC’s stake in a Malaysian insurance joint venture in 2018, acquiring 49% of HSBC Amanah Takaful (Malaysia), now renamed FWD Takaful (Malaysia).

2019-21 
In June 2019, FWD Group purchased MetLife's business in Hong Kong reportedly for around $400 million. That month, FWD Group agreed to buy SCB Life Assurance, the life insurance business of Thailand’s Siam Commercial Bank, for $3 billion, "reflecting the largest insurance deal in Southeast Asia in terms of value." FWD also launched its Malaysian takaful (Islamic insurance) market at the end of July 2019. By August 2019, FWD had applied for a license to enter a joint venture in China. Having spent $6 billion on mergers and acquisitions since its founding, in November 2019, FWD agreed to acquire Vietcombank-Cardif Life Insurance, a joint venture between Vietcombank and BNP Paribas Cardif, for $400 million. FWD announced in December 2019 it would exit its group medical insurance business in Singapore by December 2020.

In March 2020, Prudential acquired a bancassurance partnership in Thailand from FWD Group for $753 million. The following month, FWD Vietnam Life became the largest life insurer in Vietnam by charter capital. In April 2020 FWD Group launched a Covid-19 Charity Drive. In June 2020, FWD Group purchased a minority stake in the life insurance arm of PT Bank Rakyat Indonesia (BRI), PT Asuransi BRI Life, for a reported $300 million. By September 2020, press reported that FWD Group was considering an initial public offering in Hong Kong. That month, FWD Insurance purchased a stake in IPP Financial Advisers. In 2020, FWD Group had $50.9 billion in assets under management and 7.5 million customers, with 6,200 employees in Asia. In 2021, FWD Group's Value of New Business reached US$686 million. FWD Group's segmental adjusted operating profit before tax was US$205 million in 2021, representing a 64% increase over the prior year period and more than quadrupled compared to 2019. In 2021, FWD Group had 6,100 employees and $62.6 billion in assets under management, as well as 9.8 million customers. On February 28, 2022, FWD filed for a Hong Kong IPO and announced that it has raised more than US$1.6 billion in two private placement rounds since December 2021.

See also 
 List of insurance companies in Hong Kong
 Former Marine Police Headquarters
 FWD Tower

References

External links 

FWD.com

Insurance companies of Hong Kong
Companies of Hong Kong
Financial services companies established in 2013